Gaziköy is a composite word. In Turkish Gazi means "veteran" and it usually refers to Kemal Atatürk, the founder of Turkey. Köy means "village". Gaziköy can refer to:

 Afania, a village in northern Cyprus
 Gaziköy, Kozan in Adana Province, Turkey
 Gaziköy, Sivas in Sivas Province, Turkey
 Gaziköy, Şarkışla in Sivas Province, Turkey
 Gaziköy, Şarköy in Tekirdağ Province, Turkey
 Gaziköy, Darende in Malatya Province, Turkey